Dilek Ecza Deposu is the fifth largest-pharmaceutical warehouse in Turkey with US$200 million net sales figure as of December 31, 2009. Dilek Ecza provides pharmaceuticals warehouse services as a distribution channel between drug companies and hospitals and pharmacies. It operates 20 domestic branches throughout Turkey.

Background
Dilek Ecza was founded as a privately owned pharmaceutical warehouse in Antalya in 1991. Starting from 1993, it started to sell imported drugs within Mediterranean and Aegean Region in Turkey via its branches. In 2001, the company have reached 21 branches throughout the western part of Turkey. Today, the company is serving to 10,000 pharmacies within 5 distinct geographic regions in Turkey.

See also
List of companies of Turkey

Notes

External links
Dilek Ecza Official Website

Pharmaceutical companies established in 1991
Pharmaceutical companies of Turkey
1991 establishments in Turkey